(born February 19, 1979) is a Japanese musician. From 1995 to 2005 she was the bass player and vocalist of the indie rock band Supercar. She released her first solo record in 2006.

Biography 
Originating from Aomori Prefecture, Miki Furukawa placed an advertisement in a local magazine seeking fellow musicians in 1995, leading to the formation of the rock band Supercar. Supercar, which released its influential debut album Three Out Change in 1998, has been characterized as having "almost foundational importance to 21st century Japanese indie rock". After a successful, ten-year career, Supercar disbanded in 2005 in order for the members to pursue different interests.

In 2006 Furukawa released her first solo album, Mirrors, featuring a mixture of guitar-based rock songs and electronic dance-pop.  Bondage Heart (2008) pointed in a new direction, with heavy influences from post-punk, psychedelic rock and noise, whereas Very (2010) was a mostly electropop-oriented record.  In December 2009, software developer AH Software used voice samples from Furukawa to create the Vocaloid voice library SF-A2 Miki.  In 2011, Miki Furukawa and former Supercar bandmate Koji Nakamura formed the band called Lama. Lama jump-started their formation with a single entitled "Spell", which has been used as an opening theme for the anime No. 6. The single "Fantasy" was used as the ending theme for the anime Un-Go.

Discography

Singles 
 "Coffee & SingingGirl!!!" (June 21, 2006)
 "Psycho America" (March 21, 2007)
 "Candy Girl" (February 20, 2008)
 "Saihate" (December 2, 2009)

Albums 
 Mirrors (July 19, 2006)
 Bondage Heart (April 23, 2008)
 Bondage Heart Remixes (May 13, 2009)
 Very (February 17, 2010)
 Moshi Moshi, Kikoemasuka? (April 2, 2014)

References

External links 
 Official Site
 Twitter
 cinra.net interview (Japanese)

1979 births
Japanese women musicians
Ki/oon Music artists
Living people
Musicians from Aomori Prefecture
People from Hachinohe
Japanese rock bass guitarists
Women bass guitarists
Vocaloid voice providers
Japanese women rock singers
20th-century women musicians
20th-century bass guitarists
20th-century Japanese women singers
20th-century Japanese singers
21st-century women musicians
21st-century bass guitarists
21st-century Japanese women singers
21st-century Japanese singers